St. Xavier or St. Xavier's may refer to:
 St. Francis Xavier (1506–1552), a Spanish Roman Catholic saint
 St. Xavier, Montana, a census-designated place in the United States
 St. Xavier's Church, Kottar, a church in Tamil Nadu, India
 St. Xavier's Church, Peyad, a church in Kerala, India
 St. Xavier's School, a school in Delhi, India
 St. Xavier's University, Kolkata, a Jesuit university located in New Town, Kolkata, India

See also
 List of schools named after Francis Xavier
 St. Francis Xavier (disambiguation)
 St. Francis Xavier Church (disambiguation)
 San Javier (disambiguation)
 San Xavier (disambiguation)